The Golden Horse Award for Best Visual Effects is an award presented annually at the Golden Horse Awards by the Taipei Golden Horse Film Festival Executive Committee. The latest ceremony was held in 2022, with Garrett Lam, Ho Man-lok and Diu King-wai winning the award for the film Limbo.

References

Golden Horse Film Awards